Milton is an opéra comique in one act by Gaspare Spontini. The French libretto, by Victor-Joseph Étienne de Jouy and Armand-Michel Dieulafoy, is based on the life of the English poet John Milton. Milton was first performed on 27 November 1804 by the Opéra-Comique at the Salle Feydeau in Paris. It was Spontini's first major success in France. The composer planned a reworked version for performances in Germany under the title Das verlorene Paradies (Paradise Lost), but in the event it was never staged.

Roles

Synopsis
The blind poet Milton and his daughter Emma, fearing political persecution by King Charles II, find refuge with the Quaker Godwin. Godwin's niece Charlotte is in love with Milton's secretary, "Arthur". In reality, Arthur is Sir William Davenant, who has adopted this disguise because he is in love with Emma. Milton dictates verses from his poem Paradise Lost to his daughter. In the end, Davenant reveals his true identity and brings Milton a letter from the king promising he will not be punished. Davenant and Emma are now free to marry.

References

Sources
 
 Original edition of the libretto, 1805

Operas by Gaspare Spontini
French-language operas
Opéras comiques
1804 operas
Operas
John Milton
Operas set in England
Opera world premieres at the Opéra-Comique